"That Road Not Taken" is a song recorded by American country music artist Joe Diffie. It was released in August 1995 as the fifth and final single from his 1994 album Third Rock from the Sun. The song reached #40 on the Billboard Hot Country Singles & Tracks chart.  The song was written by Deborah Beasley and Casey Kelly.

Content
The song is a ballad in which the narrator ponders the outcome of a relationship that he did not pursue.

Critical reception
A review in Cash Box magazine was favorable, stating that "Diffie has found his niche. He is never more convincing than when singing this type of song."

Chart performance

References

1995 singles
1994 songs
Joe Diffie songs
Songs written by Casey Kelly (songwriter)
Epic Records singles